Cresbard is a town in Faulk County, South Dakota, United States. The population was 96 at the 2020 census.

Geography

Cresbard is located at  (45.170570, -98.947921).

Cresbard has been assigned the ZIP code 57435 and the FIPS place code 14580.

Demographics

2010 census
As of the census of 2010, there were 104 people, 61 households, and 34 families residing in the town. The racial makeup of the town was 100.0% White.

There were 61 households, of which 3.3% had children under the age of 18 living with them, 47.5% were married couples living together, 4.9% had a female householder with no husband present, 3.3% had a male householder with no wife present, and 44.3% were non-families. 39.3% of all households were made up of individuals, and 24.6% had someone living alone who was 65 years of age or older. The average household size was 1.70 and the average family size was 2.18.

The median age in the town was 63.5 years. 4.8% of residents were under the age of 18; 5.8% were between the ages of 18 and 24; 13.4% were from 25 to 44; 30.8% were from 45 to 64; and 45.2% were 65 years of age or older. The gender makeup of the town was 47.1% male and 52.9% female.

2000 census
As of the census of 2000, there were 143 people, 72 households, and 47 families residing in the town. The population density was 340.6 people per square mile (131.5/km2). There were 89 housing units at an average density of 212.0 per square mile (81.8/km2). The racial makeup of the town was 98.60% White, 0.70% Asian, and 0.70% from two or more races.

There were 72 households, out of which 13.9% had children under the age of 18 living with them, 59.7% were married couples living together, 4.2% had a female householder with no husband present, and 34.7% were non-families. 33.3% of all households were made up of individuals, and 20.8% had someone living alone who was 65 years of age or older. The average household size was 1.99 and the average family size was 2.47.

In the town, the population was spread out, with 12.6% under the age of 18, 4.2% from 18 to 24, 16.8% from 25 to 44, 37.8% from 45 to 64, and 28.7% who were 65 years of age or older. The median age was 55 years. For every 100 females, there were 101.4 males. For every 100 females age 18 and over, there were 92.3 males.

The median income for a household in the town was $35,625, and the median income for a family was $44,250. Males had a median income of $27,500 versus $17,500 for females. The per capita income for the town was $18,241. There were none of the families and 3.7% of the population living below the poverty line, including no under eighteens and 12.2% of those over 64.

History 

Cresbard celebrated its centennial in 2006.  The town was founded in 1906 when the Minneapolis & St Louis Railway completed a line from Watertown, South Dakota, to LeBeau, South Dakota on the east bank of the Missouri River. It was incorporated in 1909.  The name is an amalgam of Cressey and Bard, the names of two local families. In its early years, it served as a grain and livestock center for the northern tier of Faulk County, South Dakota.  Cresbard became a well known consolidated school district by the 1920s serving at least seven smaller communities in the surrounding area. The school's marching and concert band won national recognition in the 1950s and boys basketball and cross country teams won state titles.

The railway was abandoned by 1940 and State Highway 20 served as the town's main link to the outside world.  Following a nationwide population upswing after World War II the agriculture-based economy of the area began to show a decreasing population.  The population of the school fell from a high of 350 in the 60s and 70s to less than 100 students by the late 1990s.

Because of dwindling high school population (16 at last count ) citizens of Cresbard spent several years exploring their options.  In 2004 the town's total population fell to 121 and the decision was made to redistrict the schools.  The high school  closed and was offered for sale on the internet the following year at a price calculated to attract outside business. It was purchased to serve as the corporate headquarters of Keenspot Entertainment by Chris Crosby and Chris's mother Terri, Keenspot's co-owner. Keenspot Entertainment is a growing publisher of more than 50 online comics and related materials including a number of Crosby's own projects such as the pseudo-autobiographical Superosity which briefly was set in a fictionalized Cresbard during the story arcs "Back in the Green" and "South Dakotan Christmas" in which the high school was parodied as an abandoned mental hospital. In keeping with his wacky, satirical style, Crosby's comic characters fled from South Dakota following a fictionalized version of the Blizzard of November 28–29, 2005 .

As of 2007, the primary non-agricultural commercial venture in the town of Cresbard and surrounding areas is services related to the recreational hunting of pheasant, ducks, geese, deer, and buffalo .

Cresbard is also the home of an hotel and restaurant, museum, auto shop, oil supply company, insurance agency, a branch of Dacotah Bank, Senior Citizens center, two churches (one Lutheran Church—Missouri Synod and one Methodist), and a local fire and rescue.  It is surrounded by farmland.

Among the businesses that closed due to the decrease in population were a grocery store, drug store, hardware store, small movie theater, laundromat, and farm implement dealership.  The town no longer operates the grain elevator or lumberyard .  The services these businesses represent can now be found in neighboring towns, such as Aberdeen, South Dakota which is 40 miles away.

Ruth Wood, a retired school teacher and farm wife characterizes Cresbard as "a place where we cannot lie about our age, our background or our school pranks.  There will always be someone around who remembers all of the facts (or will supply them anyway).  There is no need to put on airs or pretense."

References

External links
 Town website
 City Data on City-Data.com

Towns in Faulk County, South Dakota
Towns in South Dakota